Țiganca is a commune in Cantemir District, Moldova. It is composed of three villages: Ghioltosu, Țiganca and Țiganca Nouă.

A cemetery of the Romanian soldiers fallen in 1941 during the military offensive to retake Bessarabia is located in Țiganca.

Notable people 
 Nina Josu (born 1953), writer and activist 
 Petru Păduraru (born 1946), priest and the current Metropolitan of Bessarabia

References

External links  
 Comisia Electorală Centrală a Republicii Moldova - Lista primarilor

Communes of Cantemir District
Populated places on the Prut
Romani communities in Moldova